Auburn Mall is a shopping mall in Auburn, Maine, United States. Opened in 1979, it features JCPenney as its anchor store. The mall also includes offices for TD Bank, N.A. George Schott is the mall's owner.

History
Auburn Mall opened in 1979. Its original anchor stores were J. C. Penney and Porteous. In 1990, Equity announced plans to expand the mall with a new wing and a Sears as a third anchor store. This would have replaced an existing Sears in Lewiston.

Porteous closed at the mall in 2002. Express and Gap closed at the mall in 2003 and 2004, respectively.

George Schott bought the mall from Equity Property and Development in 2005. Steve & Barry's opened in the former Porteous space in December 2007, but closed in September 2008. The space became offices for TD Banknorth (now TD Bank, N.A.) in 2009.

Waldenbooks closed at the mall in 2011 and was converted to Books-A-Million. In 2019, a Quebecois restaurant opened in the former Papa Gino's.

References

1979 establishments in Maine
Shopping malls established in 1979
Shopping malls in Maine
Tourist attractions in Androscoggin County, Maine
Buildings and structures in Auburn, Maine